Drako Motors, Inc. is an American luxury sports car manufacturer based in San Jose, California. Drako Motors produces the Drako GTE, an electric sports car.

History
Drako Motors was founded in the year 2013 by Dean Drako and Shiv Sikand. The company announced its DriveOS four-wheel torque vectoring, single-VCU drive operating system in August 2015.

Drako GTE

In 2019, Drako Motors announced its Drako GTE production at The Quail Motorsport. The Drako GTE is an all-electric, quad motor, full-size 4 door sports sedan that seats 4 passengers. Drako Motors announced a limited production of 25 Drako GTE vehicles in 2020, with a base price of US$1,250,000.

Drako Dragon
In November 2022, the company officially launched the Drako Dragon all-electric luxury SUV, with 2,000 HP, 200+ mph maximum speed, a 420-mile range, 500kW fast charging, and a quad motor powertrain. The Drako Dragon has a base price of US$290,000.

References 

Electric sports cars
Electric concept cars
2013 establishments in California
Manufacturing companies based in San Jose, California
Battery electric vehicle manufacturers
Luxury motor vehicle manufacturers
Car brands